Closer (sometimes known simply as Tunnels 4) is the fourth book in the Tunnels series, written by Roderick Gordon and Brian Williams. Released in the United Kingdom by Chicken House on 3 May 2010, its publication in the United States by Scholastic Inc. followed on 1 February 2011.

Plot summary

Part 1: Revelations

In the world with its own sun in the center of the Earth, the Rebecca twins dive into a pool in order to escape an explosion set off by Will and Elliott in Freefall, and eventually are able to survive by breathing air they find trapped in the roof of a mine shaft that, after being flooded, formed the pool they were camped at. Rebecca Two tends to her twin sister`s bullet wound inflicted by Will during the ambush. The Rebeccas spot in the distance a modern metropolis, with helicopters and other vehicles, including cars resembling Volkswagens. Rebecca Two sees a Limiter flare, and then signals back by blowing up a gas tank at the end of the mine shaft. She then continues to carry her dying sister toward the city. The Rebeccas find the city, and realise it is well maintained and populated. They, being potentially hostile outsiders, frighten a small number of people, and that results in the arrival of a squad of the local army. The people of the city are from an expeditionary force from Nazi Germany that arrived during World War II. The Limiter forces arrive shortly, and a short staredown occurs, and after a Limiter medic begins to operate on Rebecca One, Rebecca Two and the Limiter General begin to talk about their identity to the authorities of the city. It turns out that during the Second World War, the Styx were allies of the Third Reich. The officer of the squad informs the other two that they are in a city called ‘New Germania’. As Rebecca One recovers in a New Germanian hospital, the officer takes Rebecca Two and the Limiter General to meet the Chancellor of New Germania, whom the Styx intimidate into helping them find Will and his group, with plans to kill him and retrieve the Dominion virus.

Meanwhile, Drake wakes up in a room he does not recognize. He heads to a window, and realises that he is still Topsoil. He is then greeted by his saviour, a retired Limiter named Edward James Green, who believes that the Styx are taking unnecessary measures with their goal of reclaiming Topsoil. He also reveals himself to be Elliott's father. They then discuss various aspects of the Limiter, who is coined "Eddie" by Drake. They head for a keypad-locked cellar. Eddie and Drake enter the cellar, and Drake discovers an area akin to a briefing room. He discovers various Styx elements, including a Dark Light and the device used to incapacitate him in the Commons. Eddie then leaves Drake, giving him keys to the warehouse and the apartment. Drake finds that Chester had left a call to the emergency number – and it was sent several weeks ago.

Meanwhile, Chester and Martha return Topsoil, where Chester is inevitably very eager to contact his parents, but Martha won't permit this. She dotes obsessively on the boy, seeing him as a substitute for her dead son. This frightens Chester, who begins to make a plan to run away from her, but in the event doesn't dare put this into practice. They are walking through the night, when suddenly, Martha grabs him, and Chester panics, going as far as to hit her. When he demands an explanation, she claims she was shielding him from a Bright that has tracked the scent of their blood all the way from deep in the earth. Chester's food that Martha is feeding him makes him sick. They enter a small cottage that is unattended. They discover that it is well kept, and has various foods. Chester eats some food, and takes a shower. He then returns to the kitchen, after getting some new clothes. He begins to call his parents, when he is hit hard in the back of the head and knocked out cold. Chester is held hostage in a cupboard by Martha, and is fed meat which Martha claims is from ‘birds’. Drake and Eddie eventually find Chester, who is revolted when he finds he was eating meat from dead mailmen, whom Martha killed. Chester tells Drake and Eddie that he wants to return to his parents.

Meanwhile, Will, Dr. Burrows, and Elliott, all in the inner world, discover a group of skulls, which prove that there are native inhabitants. Dr. Burrows also claims to have seen a Stuka. Elliott prepares some early warning systems in case of Limiters or other people. She also prepares a hideaway for them to run to in case of danger, and shows Will the ancient passage the Rebeccas used to enter the inner world. Around the area she finds marks that prove that Limiters have been there recently. Will and Elliott find free time together, but are soon interrupted by Dr. Burrows, who is investigating the pyramid area, against precaution by Will and Elliott.

Back in the Colony, Mrs. Burrows is kept alive by the Second Officer, but her presence in the house begins to make his family very unpopular. She slowly regains motor control of her body, but her sight has been badly impaired. Her damaged brain heals in a different way than regular and compensates the sight loss by spontaneously developing an olfactory and auditory super-sense, as well as an ability to control her body temperature. The Second Officer’s mother and sister begin to consider ways of killing her.

Part 2: Contact

The Rebeccas find that Tom Cox, thrown into the Pore by the old Styx in the previous book, has found his way to both inner world and New Germania. The Chancellor then assigns Colonel Bismarck to assist them in their search for the Dominion virus. They board helicopters, and head for the pyramids. They find Will and Dr. Burrows, and capture them. Elliott watches the scene from high in one of the giant trees of the jungle, and before Cox can slice off one of Will's fingers at the behest of the Rebeccas, she shoots and kills him. Dr. Burrows begins trying to communicate to Elliott in a way that makes it seem as though what's going on isn't serious and that The Rebeccas are bluffing when they threaten to kill him. Rebecca Two then says that they aren’t, and without hesitation shoots Dr. Burrows and allows him to bleed to death, putting Will in a state of complete shock and grief. The Rebeccas then demand that Elliott surrenders and hands over the Dominion virus, as they found the broken phial containing the vaccine. Elliott comes up with a plan, and approaches with a device she claims to be a suicide bomber kit that activates when her hand stops holding the detonator. She then forces the Rebeccas to let them go, in exchange for the virus. They agree, and the exchange is carried out just as Will and Elliott are leaving on a helicopter with Colonel Bismarck. In his state of trauma, Will argues with Elliott over what she has just done, calling her a traitor and saying that he doesn't want anything to do with her anymore.

Meanwhile, Eddie informs Drake that the Styx obtain their viruses from "Plague Snails" that live in the Eternal City. Chester's attempt to contact his parents goes horribly wrong as the Styx have darklit them to not recognize him and to call one of their agents if he appears. Drake also finds, with devices that detect the frequencies of darklighting technology, that somebody is being darklit in London. Unknown to him at this point, the person being darklit is the Prime Minister.

Part 3: Restitution

Colonel Bismarck cannot land Will and Elliott at their supply cache in the jungle because of one of the inner world's frequent storms, and lands them as close to the location as possible. Once landed, Will confronts Elliott, asking her why she gave the Styx the virus. She tells him that she has the vaccine, having drank it before breaking the phial, and that she was bluffing with the "detonator". Chester and Drake deprogram Chester's parents. Eddie and Drake also inspect a portal into the Eternal City, in preparation for an underground operation.

The Rebecca Twins and their Limiters take the New Germanians assigned to support them prisoner as part of their plan to take over New Germania. As they brainwash the captives, it becomes evident that Rebecca Two is infatuated with the New Germanian officer that they first met when they arrived at the city, Captain Johan Franz.

Will and Elliott retrieve their weapons and supplies and start making their way through the ancient passage to the fallout shelter.

In the Colony, the old Styx tells the Second Officer that he should be prepared for the Styx to take Mrs. Burrows to the Scientists to be examined to see how she resisted the Styx's Dark Light battery for so long.

Part 4: On The Offensive

Drake and Eddie leave the warehouse to place pesticides that will annihilate the plague snails in the Eternal City, leaving Chester behind in the apartment. Drake and Eddie place the charges and detonate them, releasing a cloud of pesticide that will destroy the plague snails. After fighting their way through a Styx patrol, Drake attacks Eddie, knocking him unconscious. He did this partly because while Eddie was working for the Styx, he tortured and killed a close friend of Drake's, and then lied about the incident to Drake.

At the warehouse, Chester calls his father to tell him that their part in Drake's plan is ready, but he finds that his mother has disappeared. He tells his father that the plan has not changed, and the last place either of them want to be is at the hotel if Emily Rawls has indeed fallen under the power of the Styx. Chester and Jeff Rawls make their way to the portal, and Jeff goes to the warehouse after Chester has found the portal and begun to unpack the equipment Drake had him to bring with him: two Bergens, some firearms, and an NBC suit. Drake and Chester make their way through the Labyrinth, and attack the South Cavern's air supply, piping in nerve gas (which was in one of the Bergens that Chester brought down into the underworld) to incapacitate as many colonists as possible, so they will not interfere in the next part of the mission.

Meanwhile, the Second Officer's family rejoices when the supposedly comatose Mrs. Burrows is taken to have her brain examined by the Scientists. Colly, the family's Hunter that Mrs. Burrows has befriended, hisses at them, and they cannot understand why she is upset.

The Second Officer and Colly go to the Laboratories to make a last visit to Mrs. Burrows. Meanwhile, Drake and Chester are searching the building for any Topsoilers being held captive in there. Chester finds the Second Officer and fights with him, as the Second Officer was complicit in Chester's torture in the Hold, and the Second Officer has a grudge against Will and his friends because Will knocked him unconscious during his unsuccessful attempt to rescue Chester from the Hold. Mrs. Burrows stops pretending to be unconscious to break up the fight, but Eddie, now recovered, locks them in the operating theatre. Eddie then paralyses Drake with Dark Light training given to him while Drake was a prisoner of the Styx. Eddie tells Drake, who is still conscious, only unable to move, that his manipulations have been indirectly responsible for most of the plotlines in the series, and that he had misjudged how events would play out. He tells Drake that he wants Drake and his friends to win so he can take control of the Styx. He then knocks Drake unconscious and leaves. The Second Officer, Chester, and Mrs. Burrows unsuccessfully try to open the door until Mrs. Burrows tells Colly to wake up Drake so he can open the door. This succeeds, and they escape the North Block only moments before it explodes. The Second Officer leaves the group, and Mrs. Burrows, Chester, Drake, and Colly head for the surface. They head to Eddie's warehouse to find that he has flown the coop, leaving behind only an unconscious Jeff Rawls.

Will and Elliott make their way to the fallout shelter, but are stranded there because Chester and Martha took the only intact boat.

Meanwhile, the Rebecca twins finish their takeover of New Germania, involving darklighting many of its citizens to become part of an uncontrollable army.

Part 5: Reunion

Will uses the old phone to make a call to Drake asking for his assistance to rescue them. Drake rescues Will, Bartleby and Elliott from the fallout shelter, and takes them to the rest of the group camping with a Gypsy band. Drake then drives them all to a safe house, making sure that there is no way that they can be traced there by the Styx. The safe house is revealed to be a country estate owned by Drake's father, Parry. Drake returns from town one morning with two things: a skateboard for Chester and a book that a pair of students wrote based on Dr. Burrows's journal for Will. Will is devastated when he learns that the book, The Highfield Mole, is not a serious academic work but a novel to amuse children.

Meanwhile, the Rebecca Twins return to the Colony, presenting the Old Styx the Dominion Virus, their suspicions that Will or Elliott drank the vaccine, and the New Germainian Army.

Meanwhile, it is revealed that Mrs. Rawls, in Highfield, is not under the influence of the Styx as it initially appeared, but is only pretending to be darkly kimberly so she can spy on the Styx for Drake. Eddie appears, foiling an attempt to make her place a bomb for the Styx, and takes her away from Highfield.

In the epilogue, a news report about the closure of the three hospitals to which Drake provided samples of Elliott's blood is interrupted by a bulletin about a Styx attack on the Royal Mint, and that the police (who, along with the rest of the government, are being manipulated by the Styx) believe the mastermind behind the plot is Drake.

Errata

In Freefall, the Rebecca Twin with the broken teeth was referred to as "Rebecca Two"; in Closer, she was "Rebecca One."

External links
Tunnels Books Series Official Website
Tunnels Series UK Official Fansite

2009 British novels
2009 science fiction novels
British science fiction novels
British young adult novels
Children's science fiction novels
Biological weapons in popular culture
Bioterrorism in fiction
Fictional civilizations
Hollow Earth in fiction
Lost world novels
Novels about cannibalism
Novels about Nazi fugitives
Novels about serial killers
Novels set in subterranea
The Chicken House books